Mike Revis is an American politician who served as a Democratic member of the Missouri House of Representatives for the 97th district from 2018 to 2019.

Background
Revis graduated from Rockwood Summit High School and worked for Anheuser-Busch InBev as a purchasing manager. He also was an intern for Governor Jay Nixon.

On February 6, 2018, Revis won a special election to succeed John McCaherty (R), who resigned as state representative for District 97.

References

21st-century American politicians
Living people
Democratic Party members of the Missouri House of Representatives
Politicians from St. Louis
Year of birth missing (living people)